The 2022 RoKit F4 British Championship was a multi-event, Formula 4 open-wheel single seater motor racing championship held across United Kingdom. The championship featured a mix of professional motor racing teams and privately funded drivers, competing in Formula 4 cars that conformed to the technical regulations for the championship. This, the eighth season, following on from the British Formula Ford Championship, was the eighth year that the cars conform to the FIA's Formula 4 regulations. Part of the TOCA tour, it forms part of the extensive program of support categories built up around the BTCC centrepiece.

The season commenced on 23 April at Donington Park and concluded on 9 October at Brands Hatch, utilising the Grand Prix circuit, after thirty races held at ten meetings, all in the support of the 2022 British Touring Car Championship.

This was the first season of the championship using the combination of Tatuus chassis and the engines supplied by Abarth.

Teams and drivers
All teams were British-registered. Seven teams were chosen initially to compete in the series.

Race calendar 
All races were held in the United Kingdom. All rounds supported 2022 British Touring Car Championship. The provisional calendar was announced by BTCC on 31 June 2021 and Motorsport UK, the new organiser of the Formula 4 series, confirmed its presence alongside on 24 September 2021.

Championship standings 

Points were awarded to the top ten classified finishers in races 1 and 3 and for the top eight classified finishers in race 2. Race two, which had its grid formed by reversing the order of the ten best drivers from the qualifying session, awarded extra points for positions gained from the drivers' respective starting positions. Bonus points counted towards only the drivers' standings.

Drivers' Standings

Rookie Cup

Teams Cup

Notes

References

External links 

 

F4 British Championship seasons
British
F4
British F4